Gunnes is a surname. Notable people with the surname include:

 Erik Gunnes (1924–1999), Norwegian historian
 Jon Gunnes (born 1956), Norwegian politician

See also
 Gunne
 Gunness
 Belle Gunness, Norwegian-American serial killer